Under Museum Quality Glass is the first studio album from the band Pivitplex. Originally released by Hawley Recording Company and Sonicfish Records, it was picked up by BEC Recordings for re-release.

Track listing 
 Some Will Fall Listen
 Grounded
 You Know
 Cash it in
  Over Shaken
  Rosetta Stone
  Feeling Fear
  Nothing Without You
  You and Me
  Clarity
  Lullaby

References

External links
http://www.purevolume.com/pivitplex

2003 albums